Gordon Peter Flick (August 13, 1921 – March 22, 2006) was an American professional basketball player. He played in the National Basketball League for the Oshkosh All-Stars (three games in 1943–44) and Waterloo Hawks (two games in 1948–49), where he averaged 1.6 points per game for his career. He played professionally prior to enrolling at Drake University in the 1940s, where he was later named to the school's All-1940s Team.

References

1921 births
2006 deaths
American men's basketball players
Centers (basketball)
Drake Bulldogs men's basketball players
Forwards (basketball)
Oshkosh All-Stars players
Basketball players from Minneapolis
Waterloo Hawks players